Saude is an unincorporated community in northern Chickasaw County, in the U.S. state of Iowa.

Geography
Saude lies at the intersection of 110th Street and Stevens Avenue. It is north of Saude Park.

History
 A post office was established at Saude in 1877, and remained in operation until 1915.

Saude was platted in the northern part of Jacksonville Township, one mile south of the northern boundary of Chickasaw County.

Saude Lutheran Church was founded in 1857 by Norwegian settlers in Saude, under Reverend U.V. Koren. The Saude church still holds services.

Saude's population was 21 residents in 1902. 

In 1916, the rural schools around Saude consolidated, and the Consolidated School District of Saude was formed. The consolidated school district covered approximately 23 square miles at that time. 

In 1919, historian Robert Herd Fairbairn wrote of Saude, "Saude is the only town worthy of the name in the township. It is located on the river from which it derives its name, which is one of the east tributaries of the Little Turkey River. Saude boasts of a store, a blacksmith shop, two churches and a creamery. The population is not large, but the town is surrounded by a thrifty, industrious and intelligent community who are loyal to their town and have an abiding faith in its prospects and permanency." Saude had 18 residents in 1925.

In 1940, Saude's population was 18.

See also
Little Turkey, Iowa

References

Unincorporated communities in Chickasaw County, Iowa
Unincorporated communities in Iowa